Guilty is a 2011 French drama film directed by Vincent Garenq about the Outreau trial. Garenq was nominated for the 2012 Best Writing (Adaptation) César Award and Philippe Torreton was nominated as Best Actor.

Synopsis 
The movie relates the story of Alain Marécaux, one of the defendants of the Outreau's case.

Halted in november 2001 with 13 other people, wrongly accused about pedophilia's acts, he has past 23 months into jail. 

He was obliged to sell his study of court bailiff, his wife broke up with him and he has been separated from his children before to be finally acquitted in december 2005. 

His mom let herself die of sadness (of hunger) during the first months of his imprisonment.

He made many suicide attempt and a hunger strike and was nearly close to death at the moment of his release. 

Ten years later, he rebuilt himself in part : a new wife, a new study... but never achieved to recreate true links with his children.

Cast
 Philippe Torreton as Alain Marécaux
 Wladimir Yordanoff as Maître Hubert Delarue
 Noémie Lvovsky as Edith Marécaux
 Raphaël Ferret as judge Burgaud
 Michelle Goddet (credited as Michèle Goddet) as Thessy, Alain's sister 
 Farida Ouchani as Myriam Badaoui
 Olivier Claverie as the prosecutor
 Jean-Pierre Bagot as Alain's father
 Sarah Lecarpentier as Aurélie Grenon
 Kevin Tholliez as Thomas Marécaux
 Loris Rouah as Sébastien Marécaux
 Charlotte Ghristi as Cécilé Marécaux

References

External links
 

2011 films
2011 crime drama films
French crime drama films
Crime films based on actual events
Films about miscarriage of justice
2010s French-language films
2010s French films